Arsenije is a Serbian given name, a variant of the Greek name Arsenios. Diminutives of the name include Arsen, Arsa and Arso. It may refer to:

Arsenije Sremac (d. 1266), second Archbishop of the Serbian Orthodox Church (1233–1263)
Arsenije II, Archbishop of Peć and Serbian Patriarch from 1457 to 1463
Arsenije III Čarnojević (1633–1706), Serbian Patriarch (1674–1706)
Arsenije IV Jovanović Šakabenta (1698–1748), Serbian Patriarch (1725–1748)
Arsenije Plamenac, Metropolitan of Cetinje (1781–1784)
Arsenije Sečujac (1720–1814), Habsburg general
Arsenije Loma (1778–1815), Serbian revolutionary
Arsenije Milošević (1931–2006), Yugoslav and Serbian film and television director
Arsenije Zlatanović (b. 1989), Serbian tennis player

Further reading

Serbian masculine given names